Bodil Steensen-Leth, née Heide-Jørgensen (born 12 January 1945, Svendborg) is a Danish writer.

She is the daughter of Henning Heide-Jørgensen and graduated from the Svendborg Gymnasium in 1963. After studying at the University of Oregon (1963-1964) and the University of Copenhagen, she married the landowner Christian Vincens Steensen-Leth in 1967 and moved to his Steensgård manorhouse in northern Langeland. At the same time she began a distance-learning course from Odense University, graduating MA in English in 1972.

Only when her children had started to grow up did she find enough time for writing, producing her debut Pandæmonien og andre fortællinger (Pandæmonien and other stories) in 1984. She was also a literary critic for the Jyllands-Posten from 1978 to 1998 and a member of the Modersmålsselskabet's board of directors from 1982 to 1988. She received a one-off payment from the Danish Arts Foundation in 1988 and a grant from them in 1999.

Works 
 Pandæmonion, novella, 1984
 Dødens labyrint, novella, 1986
 Alle stirrer på mig, novel, 1987
 Jomfru Fanny, novel, 1989
 Møller, novel, 1991
 Stenen og lyset, novel, 1994
 Den sidste koncert, novella, 1996
 Ikke som en spottefugl, novel, 1998
 Prinsesse af blodet, novel, 2000
 Guds øje, novella, 2002
 Lili, novel, 2004
 Fem år i Berlin, novel, 2008
 Tradition og fornyelse, 2009 – part of the Slægten (race) series of novels

External links
Bodil Steensen-Leth
Bodil Steensen-Leth on litteratursiden.dk
Bodil Steensen-Leth on Bibliografi.dk

1945 births
Living people
20th-century Danish writers
Danish women novelists
20th-century Danish women writers
University of Copenhagen alumni
University of Oregon alumni